The Sacred Art Museum of Funchal is located in the Episcopal Palace of Funchal, Madeira. It is made up of collections of painting, sculpture, goldsmithery and paramentaria from the 15th to 19th centuries. In particular, it includes Early Netherlandish painting from the 15th and 16th centuries, which reached Madeira in the 16th century in the so-called golden age of sugar production. The Flemish panels are distinguished not only by their high quality but also by the large dimensions, uncommon in the museums of Europe. Also worthy of mention is the collection of Flemish sculpture, especially from Mechelen and Antwerp.

References

1955 establishments in Portugal
Art museums established in 1955
Art museums and galleries in Portugal
Buildings and structures in Funchal
Museums in Madeira
Tourist attractions in Funchal